Breaker is a fictional character from the G.I. Joe: A Real American Hero toyline, comic books and animated series. He is the G.I. Joe Team's original communications officer and debuted in 1982.

Profile
His real name is Alvin R. Kibbey, and his rank is that of corporal E-4. Breaker was born in Gatlinburg, Tennessee.

Breaker is familiar with all NATO and Warsaw Pact communication gear, as well as most world export devices. His primary military specialty is Infantry, and as his secondary military specialty he is a radio telecommunications technician. His specialized education includes Signal School, where he studied covert electronics and was involved with Project GAMMA. He is a qualified expert in the M-16, M-1911A1, and MAC-10 (Ingram). Breaker is described as "efficient and self-assured, and has an uncanny ability to turn adverse situations to his favor." He also speaks seven languages.

Breaker is the link between the battlefield and headquarters and has the ability to call in an air strike, provide artillery coordinates, request a Med-Evac or find an extraction site. Breaker constantly monitors all radio frequencies, providing situation reports to the command center. He also has the ability to crack enemy codes and to jam their transmissions. He is well liked by his teammates, although he has a habit of chewing bubble gum in any situation.

In the UK Action Force toy series, Breaker is from Munich in Germany.

Toys
Breaker was first released as an action figure in 1982. All of the original sixteen figures from 1982 were released with "straight arms." The same figure was re-released in 1983 with "swivel-arm battle grip", which made it easier for figures to hold their rifles and accessories.

In Argentina, straight-arm Breaker was recolored in gray and available as "Topson". A version of Breaker nearly identical to the U.S. version was released in Argentina as "Roger" and in Brazil as "Falcon".

A new version of Breaker was released in 1997, as part of the "Stars and Stripes Forever" boxed set.

Figures of the character in the 25th Anniversary line include a bubblegum bubble accessory. To coincide with the launch of the movie G.I. Joe: The Rise of Cobra, Hasbro released a figure in 2009 based on the Breaker movie character, listed as Abel "Breaker" Shaz.

Comics

Marvel Comics
In the Marvel Comics G.I. Joe series, Breaker first appeared in issue #1 (June 1982), along with the rest of the original team, in a mission to rescue the peace activist Dr. Adele Burkhart from a Cobra stronghold.

Breaker is chosen, along with just three other Joes, in the team's next mission to the North Pole. In issue #5, Breaker joins Steeler and Clutch in a parade with the M.O.B.A.T. (Multi-Ordnance Battle Tank); Cobra appears and attempts to steal the tank, which has no ammunition, so the Joes turn the tank's speakers to full blast and amplify the sound of Breaker's gum popping through a microphone in order to fool Cobra into thinking the cannon has fired a live round, which successfully encourages Cobra to surrender. Breaker's gum comes in handy again in issue #12; he is captured and tied with rope along with Gung-Ho and Stalker, and they rub the gum on the ropes to coax rats into gnawing through them.

Breaker makes a supporting appearance in issue #19, in which Hawk assigns him to travel with Clutch to look out for Cobra, who is sending forces to attack Joe headquarters on Staten Island. The invading Cobras spot them and launch missiles at them, but the Joes escape into their headquarters moments before the missiles strike. After the successful defeat of Cobra forces, the two pick up the stranded Snake Eyes, and become the first to learn of the tragic death of the valued Joe ally Kwinn. Breaker, Steeler, Clutch and two police officers fight Cobra agents and robots in the Florida Everglades.

During a celebration in the Pit, Clutch and Breaker propose to Cover Girl that they could manage her and Scarlett as a mud wrestling team, but she turns them down. Tunnel Rat and Breaker are part of a team sent to plant spy equipment in the New York Cobra Consulate building. The duo's job is to literally destroy a communications line, then repair it; all part of a plan that concludes exactly as the Joes wanted. Breaker is seen during the Cobra Island civil war story with a wounded right arm.

His last appearance is in issue #109. Breaker and many Joes are captured by Cobra forces during a mission in Trucial Abysmia. Due to a misunderstanding by their captors, the group is set to be executed. Many of the Joes, including Doc, Thunder, and Heavy Metal, are killed by a S.A.W. Viper, before Lt. Falcon injures him with a knife. Breaker and the surviving Joes steal a Cobra "Rage" tank, and flee into the desert. Shortly after Breaker sends a communication to the Pit via the Rage's radio equipment, the tank is destroyed, killing him, Crazylegs, and Quick Kick.

Breaker is featured in a later issue via flashback. A story is told about the early days of G.I. Joe, where Breaker, Scarlett and Rock 'n Roll are assigned to infiltrate an armed island. The owner was supposed to be a neutral party in disputes between varied military forces, but had decided to start a criminal empire of her own. The three Joes shut her down.

Animated series

Sunbow
Breaker appeared in the original G.I. Joe animated series. Breaker first appeared in the "A Real American Hero" mini-series. He was voiced by Chris Latta, and his uniform was a dark, grayish-blue instead of green. Breaker appeared in the first half of the show as G.I. Joe's communications officer, but rarely was involved in combat or episode plots, especially as the series went on. In many of his appearances, Breaker is at Joe headquarters monitoring Joe or Cobra activity or other transmissions. In the episode "Cold Slither", Breaker, Shipwreck and Footloose are brainwashed by Cobra through subliminal messages in music. He is later seen playing the keyboard when the Joes perform the series' theme song.

G.I. Joe: The Movie
Breaker had a fleeting cameo in the 1987 animated film G.I. Joe: The Movie. He became a prisoner of Cobra-La and partakes in the film's final action sequence.

G.I. Joe: Renegades
Breaker first appears in the G.I. Joe: Renegades episode "The Package." In this show, Alvin Kibbey is a college student who used to work for SSS Market (which is owned by Cobra) until he was fired upon being accused of stealing one of their scanners (which he secretly did after that). Alvin starts an Anti-Cobra blog under the alias of the Coyote. G.I. Joe stumbles upon a plot to dispose of him, when they discover that a package to him was a bomb. When they find Alvin, he recognizes Scarlett by her blog screen name. Alvin explains that the scanner he stole contains the info on any illegal weapon selling that SSS Market has been doing. G.I. Joe protects him when Baroness sends Major Bludd to assassinate him. Cobra is fooled into thinking Alvin had perished when a thrown knife goes through the scanner in his backpack instead of his body. Alvin had also laid a trap using the bomb to destroy a Cobra weapons depot.

In the episode "Return of the Arashikage" Pt. 1, it appears that Breaker has been placed in a hidden location by G.I. Joe in order to find any other evidence that would expose the illegal activities of Cobra Industries. In the episode "The Enemy of My Enemy," Breaker is mentioned to have some informants working for him to supply any info to G.I. Joe, if those informants are not killed by one of Cobra Commander's operatives first. In the episode "Revelations" Pt. 2, Breaker was seen in the company of General Abernathy and the Falcons when the Joes and Professor Patrick O'Hara arrived with the right evidence that would clear their names.

Live action film

G.I. Joe: The Rise of Cobra

Breaker is featured in G.I. Joe: The Rise of Cobra, played by Saïd Taghmaoui. In the movie, his name was changed to Abel Shaz, and he was a member of the Moroccan military before joining G.I. Joe. The film includes a nod to the Marvel Comics version, when during the Paris sequence, Breaker borrows gum from Duke and blows a bubble with it.

Video games
Breaker appears as a non-playable supporting character in the video game G.I. Joe: The Rise of Cobra, voiced by Charles Fathy.

References

External links
 Breaker at JMM's G.I. Joe Comics Home Page
 Breaker at YOJOE.com

Action film characters
Comics characters introduced in 1982
Fictional characters from Tennessee
Fictional corporals
Fictional gunfighters
Fictional military sergeants
Fictional United States Army personnel
G.I. Joe soldiers
Male characters in animated series
Male characters in comics
Male characters in film